Wikstroemia tenuiramis grows as a small tree up to  tall. Inflorescences bear up to five yellowish or cream-coloured flowers. Fruit is yellow, green or orange. The specific epithet tenuiramis is from the Latin meaning "thin branches". Habitat is swamps and forests from sea-level to  altitude. W. tenuiramis is found in Sumatra and Borneo.

References

tenuiramis
Plants described in 1861
Trees of Sumatra
Trees of Borneo